Eusebia may refer to:

 Eusebia (empress) (died 360), second wife of the Roman emperor Constantius II
 Ereleuva or Eusebia (died c. 500), the mother of Theoderic the Great
  St. Eusebia (disambiguation), any of several Christian saints

 Kayseri or Eusebia, a Turkish city
 Tyana or Eusebia, a city of ancient Cappadocia
 Scotopteryx (syn. Eusebia), a genus of moth
 Oma Eusebia, a wolf character in the German comic Fix and Foxi
Eusebia Cosme (1908–1976), Afro-Cuban poetry reciter and actress

See also
 Eusebeia (Greek: εὐσέβεια), a Greek philosophical and Biblical concept meaning inner piety, spiritual maturity, or godliness.
 Eusebius (disambiguation) (masculine name)
 Eusebio (disambiguation)